Aberdeen Kittybrewster station opened on 20 September 1854 to serve the Great North of Scotland Railway main line to Keith. The track remains in use as a freight siding for the docks.

References

Notes

Sources
 
 
 

Disused railway stations in Aberdeen
Former Great North of Scotland Railway stations
Railway stations in Great Britain opened in 1854
Railway stations in Great Britain closed in 1856
1854 establishments in Scotland
1856 disestablishments in Scotland